Monterrei is a municipality located in the Province of Ourense in the Galicia region of north-west Spain.

Monterrey is well known for its castle, built in the 10th century. The Mexican city of Monterrey was named in honour of Gaspar de Zúñiga, 5th Count of Monterrey, as was the American city of Monterey.

Parishes

 Albarellos (Santiago)
 La Magdalena
 Estevesiños (San Mamede)
 Flariz (San Pedro)
 Infesta (San Vicenzo)
 Medeiros (Santa María)
 Monterrey
 Rebordondo (San Martiño)
 San Cristóbal
 Vences (Santa Eulalia)
 Villaza

References  

Municipalities in the Province of Ourense